Umblu is an island belonging to the country of Estonia.

It is located about 0.6 km south from Rohusi island.

See also
List of islands of Estonia

  

Islands of Estonia
Jõelähtme Parish